The Order of the Disa is a provincial-level order issued by the Department of the Premier of Western Cape Province. It was created by the Provincial Honours Act 9 of 1999, and is enshrined in Section 6 (1) of the Western Cape Provincial Constitution. It is awarded in the following three levels:
 Commander: for rendering excellent meritorious service
 Officer: for rendering outstanding meritorious service
 Member: for rendering noteworthy meritorious service.

It was first awarded in 2003 by then-premier Marthinus van Schalkwyk at Castle of Good Hope, and has been awarded intermittently ever since.

List of honorees

2007
 Helen Suzman - Commander
 Basil February - Commander
 James Arnold la Guma - Commander
 Clements Kadalie - Commander
 Dulcie Evonne - Commander
 Harold Jack Simons - Commander
 Elizabeth (Nana) Abrahams - Officer
 Reverend Michael Lapsley SSM - Officer
 Reginald September - Officer
 Elizabeth Mafikeng - Officer
 Anna Berry - Officer
 Dora Tamana - Officer
 John James Issel - Officer
 Mpho Leboho - CIVIL ENGINEERING GRADUATE
 Alex La Guma - Officer, Posthumous
 Sir Richard Edmonds Luyt - Officer, Posthumous
 Molly Blackburn - Officer, Posthumous
 Hilda Bernstein - Officer, Posthumous
 Gaby Shapiro - Officer, Posthumous
 Autshumao “Harry de Strandloper” - Officer, Posthumous
 Sarah Baartman - Officer, Posthumous
 Cheryl Carolus - Officer
 Solomon Makosana - Officer, Posthumous
 Archbishop Njongonkulu Ndungane - Officer
 Tony Links - Officer, Posthumous
 Izak L. de Villiers - Officer
 Leonora van den Heever - Officer
 Patricia Gorvalla - Officer
 Pamela Golding - Officer
 Osma Mbombo - Officer
 Ronald Herbolt - Officer, Posthumous
 Richard Ishmail - Member, Posthumous
 Evelina Tshabalala - Member
 Zikiswa Matamo - Member
 Nomawethu Nika - Member
 Taswell Papier - Member
 Iris Barry - Member, Posthumous
 Ronald Harrison - Member
 Fred Carneson - Member, Posthumous
 Sarah Carneson - Member
 Anneline Rabie - Member
 Mbuyiselo Sodayise - Member, Posthumous
 Johannna Barnes - Member
 Helena Marincowitz - Member, Posthumous
 Jacob du Plessis - Member
 Isaac David Morkel - Member, Posthumous
 Rev. Martin Jack Reginald Wessels - Member, Posthumous
 Imam Armien Baker - Member, Posthumous
 Lutz Christian van Dijk - Member
 Lucas Janse van Rensburg - Member
 Michael Shand - Member
 Jarl Are Hovstad - Member
 David Walter Patrick - Member, Posthumous
 Sheik Abdul Hamid Gabier - Member

2006
 Molefi Nathanael Oliphant - Officer
 Dr Irvin Khoza - Officer
 Daniel (Danny) Alexander Jordaan - Officer

2005
 Nelson Mandela - Commander
 Archbishop Desmond Tutu - Commander
 Dr. Abdullah Abdulrahman (posthumous) - Officer
 Dr. Neville Alexander - Officer
 Ray Alexander - Officer
 Dr. Allan Boesak - Officer
 Brian Bunting - Officer
 Dr. Danie Craven (posthumous) - Officer
 Richard Dudley - Officer
 Colin Eglin - Officer
 Prof. George Ellis - Officer
 Imam Abdullah Haroun (posthumous) - Officer
 Hassan Howa - Officer
 Prof. Willie Jonker - Officer
 Philip Kgosana - Officer
 Adv. Bennie Kies (professor) - Officer
 Mildred Lesiea - Officer
 Zora Mehlomakulu - Officer
 Sheikh Nazeem Mohamed - Officer
 Judge Essa Moosa - Officer
 Oscar Mpetha - Officer
 Solwandle Ngudle (posthumous) - Officer
 Jan Rabie (posthumous) - Officer
 Dr. David Rabkin - Officer
 Dr. Richard Rive - Officer
 Rabbi Dr. David Sherman - Officer
 Mark Shuttleworth - Officer
 Annie Silinga - Officer
 Prof. Adam Small - Officer
 Christmas Tinto - Officer
 Basil Coetzee (posthumous) - Officer
 Archbishop Emeritus Joost de Blank - Officer
 Robbie Jansen - Officer
 Zollie Malindi - Officer
 Winston Mankunku - Officer
 Reverend Sikolakhe Marawu - Officer
 Dr. Anton Rupert - Officer
 Zackie Achmat - Member
 Imam Manie Bassier - Member
 Mary Burton - Member
 Cissie Gool - Member
 Archbishop Lawrence Henry - Member
 David Kramer - Member
 Dr. Kwesi Madikiza - Member
 Dorothy Mfaco - Member
 Maxwell Moss - Member
 Margaret Nash (posthumous) - Member
 Madoda Ntilashe (posthumous) - Member
 Reggie Olifant (posthumous) - Member
 Taliep Petersen - Member
 Vincent Qunta (posthumous) - Member
 Dr. Hannah-Reeve Sanders - Member
 Victor Ritchie - Member
 Amy Thornton - Member
 Ernst van Dyk - Member
 Father Basil van Rensburg - Member

2004
 Archbishop Desmond Tutu - Commander
 Dr Abdullah Ibrahim - Officer
 Antjie Krog - Officer
 Mark Shuttleworth - Officer
 Dr Franklin Sonn - Officer
 Abdulah Mohamed Omar - Officer
 Adam Small - Officer
 Dr Mamphela Ramphele - Officer
 Prof. Njabulo Ndebele - Officer
 Helen Lieberman - Member
 Pieter-Dirk Uys - Member
 Chester Williams - Member
 Willie Bester - Member
 Prof. Lynette Denny - Member
 Ian Douglas - Member
 Dawn Hare - Member
 Rashid Lombard - Member
 Prof. Nomvula Mtetwa - Member
 Ernst van Dyk - Member
 David Samaai - Member
 Millin Smith Petersen (posthumous) - Member
 Dr Frank James Lloyd Quint (posthumous) - Member
 Christiaan Jacobus Du Toit - (?)

2003
 Archbishop Desmond Tutu - Commander
 Raymond Ackerman - Officer
 John Coetzee - Officer
 DP de Villiers (posthumous) - Officer
 Jakes Gerwel - Officer
 Adam Small - Officer
 Frank Bradlow (posthumous) - Member
 David Jack - Member
 Helen Lieberman - Member
 Mavis Nduzulwana - Member
 Adele Seale - Member
 Mark Shuttleworth - Member
 Phyllis Spira - Member
 Pieter-Dirk Uys - Member
 Willem van Schalkwyk (posthumous) - Member
 Chester Williams - Member

References

See also
 Western Cape Golden Cross

Orders, decorations, and medals of South Africa
Western Cape
Orders, decorations, and medals of country subdivisions
1999 establishments in South Africa
Awards established in 1999